Theater of the Sea, established in 1946, is a marine mammal park located in the Village of Islamorada, Florida, United States. It is a tourist attraction located on Windley Key in the Florida Keys. Visitors can swim with Atlantic bottlenose dolphins, California sea lions, and sting rays and nurse sharks. Dolphins swim in and jump through a hoop and ring a bell.  The  site also has exotic birds, lizards, crocodilians, sea turtles, tropical, game fish, sharks, and other forms of marine life.  Short cruises and bottomless boat rides are also conducted.

The park also engages in ecological conservation programs, including the first artificial flipper transplant on a sea turtle.

History

The property on which Theater of the Sea sits was formerly a quarry used to supply rock for construction of Henry Flagler's Overseas Railroad.  When the railroad went bankrupt after the devastating Labor Day Hurricane, the property was sold by the receivership to a local for $800 (having no interest in the property, the local was offered a parcel stretching to Whale Harbor, about 0.2 miles to the west, for the same $800).

Theater of the Sea opened in 1946.

In 2020, the park has 7 bottlenose dolphins : Sherry (F), Stormy (M), Nikki (F), Kimbit (M), Sherman (M), Skipper (M) and Crystal (F).

References

External links

Tourist attractions in the Florida Keys
Dolphinariums
Buildings and structures in Monroe County, Florida
Zoos in Florida
Islamorada, Florida
1946 establishments in Florida